Qavamabad (also Romanized as Qavāmābād, Qawwāmābād, and Quvvāmābād) is a village in Kamin Rural District, in the Central District of Pasargad County, Fars Province, Iran. At the 2006 census, its population was 857, in 185 families.

References 

Populated places in Pasargad County